Paulo Cesar "Tilon" Chavez Quirarte  (born 7 January 1976) is a Mexican former footballer who played as a midfielder.

He played midfielder and is known for his precise passing and his speed.

Chivas 
Chavez debuted with Chivas on December 12, 1993, against Puebla F.C. where Chivas won 2–0. Since his debut, he started every single game for Chivas. He helped Chivas win the cup in Verano 1997 by scoring one of the six goals against Toros Neza. Chavez made his third stint with the club by participating in the SuperLiga. He recently stated that he only wants to play for the senior team only.

Other Mexican Clubs 
In 2000, Chavez was transferred to CF Monterrey. He was a key player as he once was with Chivas. He would go on to play all of their games. In 2004, he would be transferred to CD Toluca where he saw little playing time. In 2005, Chavez would return to Chivas for the tournament Apertura 2005. Having little participation, he would register to play with CD Tapatio. In the tournament Apertura 2006, he would play for Monarcas Morelia with 707 minutes in 10 games. On January 3, 2007, he would return to CD Tapatio. In 2009, he joins Club Necaxa in the Liga de Ascenso and obtains the bi-campeonato with the team after scoring a goal against Leon in the final.  He was a big part in Necaxa going back to the first division.

Mexico National Team 
Chavez was a huge part of Mexico national team. He Represented his country in Copa America 1999. Unfortunately a very hard decision from Manuel Lapuente would leave him and David Oteo out the 1998 FIFA World Cup. In total he has made 30 appearances for the Mexican team.

International goals

|- 
| 1. || November 9, 1997 || Mexico City, Mexico ||  || 3–3 || Draw || 1998 FIFA World Cup qualification
|-
| 2. || June 9, 1999 || Chicago, United States ||  || 2–2 || Draw || Friendly
|}

Titles

References

External links

1976 births
Living people
Footballers from Guadalajara, Jalisco
Association football midfielders
C.D. Guadalajara footballers
Atlético Morelia players
C.F. Monterrey players
Deportivo Toluca F.C. players
C.D. Veracruz footballers
Club León footballers
Club Necaxa footballers
Irapuato F.C. footballers
Dorados de Sinaloa footballers
Liga MX players
Mexico international footballers
1997 FIFA Confederations Cup players
1997 Copa América players
1999 Copa América players
Toros Neza footballers
Mexican footballers